Andrew Timothy Cooper, Baron Cooper of Windrush (born 9 June 1963) is a British politician and former Director of Strategy in the Cameron–Clegg coalition. He entered the House of Lords as a Conservative peer, but was suspended from the party whip (and also his Party membership) for endorsing the Liberal Democrats in the 2019 European Parliament elections.

Biography 

Lord Cooper of Windrush is co-founder of the research and strategy consultancy Populus Ltd. He took a leave of absence from Populus to serve from March 2011 to October 2013 as Director of Strategy in the Prime Minister's Office, 10 Downing Street, where he was architect of then Prime Minister David Cameron's policy on same-sex marriage.

When his Downing Street appointment was announced, New Labour strategist Philip Gould (Lord Gould of Brookwood) wrote of Cooper that "he is without doubt the best political pollster of his generation, and one of the few who knows how to fuse polling and strategy". The commentator Matthew d'Ancona in The Daily Telegraph (19 February 2011) wrote that Cooper's "great gift to the Conservative Party has not been liberal ideology, but a pitiless empiricism".

Before leaving to found Populus, he worked for the Conservative Party from 1995 to 1999, first as Deputy Director of the Conservative Research Department, overseeing the party's private opinion polling and then, after the 1997 landslide election defeat, Director of Strategy to then party leader William Hague. He wrote and presented a modernising strategy for Conservative recovery ('Kitchen Table Conservatives') in 1998. Described by Financial Times political commentator Janan Ganesh as "the first moderniser", Lord Cooper has been a continuous voice for modernisation, writing numerous papers, articles, presentations and book chapters (including 'A party in a foreign land' in Blue Tomorrow, edited by Nick Boles, Michael Gove and Ed Vaizey, in 2001). He is a member of the Advisory Boards of the Conservative modernising organisations Bright Blue and Renewal. He was created Baron Cooper of Windrush, of Chipping Norton in the County of Oxfordshire, on 17 September 2014.

Lord Cooper was a member of the Social Democratic Party (SDP) from 1981 to 1988. He worked for the SDP in its policy department from 1986 to 1988 and then, after declining to join the new party merged out of the old Liberal Party and a big chunk of the SDP, became a member of the 'continuing' SDP and went to work for the its leader David Owen as a parliamentary researcher and policy adviser. In the run-up to the 1992 election he was among the group of young former SDP members, led by his close university friend Daniel Finkelstein, who publicly backed John Major and the Conservative Party.

Lord Cooper was educated at Reigate Grammar School, Reigate, Surrey (where his class-mates included Keir Starmer and the future American-based conservative journalist Andrew Sullivan), and at London School of Economics. He is married and has three daughters.

In popular culture
Cooper was portrayed by actor Gavin Spokes in the 2019 HBO and Channel 4-produced drama entitled Brexit: The Uncivil War.

References

External links 
Lord Cooper of Windrush – UK Parliament
Andrew Cooper – Populus

1963 births
Living people
People educated at Reigate Grammar School
Alumni of the London School of Economics
Conservative Party (UK) life peers
Social Democratic Party (UK) politicians
Life peers created by Elizabeth II